Genealogy Roadshow is an American genealogy documentary series that debuted on PBS on September 23, 2013. The series explores the genealogies of those who attend a historically significant location in the United States, where a team of experienced genealogists present their research.

Since the third season ended, PBS has made no announcement as to whether or not if there will be a fourth season.

Format
The series takes place in different historically significant locations in the United States. A team of genealogists: D. Joshua Taylor, Kenyatta D. Berry, and Mary M. Tedesco present research to those who have sent in applications for research to appear on the show.

Other genealogists
 Emmett Miller

Episodes

Season 1 (2013)

Season 2 (2015)

Season 3 (2016)

See also
Finding Your Roots
Who Do You Think You Are? (American TV series)

References

External links
Official website

2010s American documentary television series
2013 American television series debuts
English-language television shows
PBS original programming
Television series about family history